Gall is a kind of swelling growth on living things.

Gall may also refer to:

Culture and politics
 Gall Force, a 1980s Japanese science fiction animation series
 In Summerland (novel), a gall is a place where two parts of the Lodgepole meet
 Gall v. United States, a United States Supreme Court case about criminal sentencing
 A term used by Gaels to describe foreigners, associated with Norse-Gaels

People
 Gall (surname), list of people with the surname
 Gall (Native American leader) (c. 1840–1894), Hunkpapa Lakota war leader
 Saint Gall (c. 550–c. 646), Irish disciple

Other uses
 Galling, a form of metal wear when two surfaces slide across one another
 Bile, a fluid that aids in digestion
 Colocynth, the bitter apple or vine of Sodom
 Boldness or chutzpah, a personal characteristic of fearlessness and effrontery

See also

 
 
 Gallbladder
 Gaul (disambiguation)
 Galle (disambiguation)
 Gal (disambiguation)